Raymond Ezekiel Vickery Jr. (born April 30, 1942) is an American attorney and politician. From 1974 to 1980, he served as a Democratic member of the Virginia House of Delegates. Rather than seek reelection in 1979, he challenged incumbent Charles Waddell for the Democratic nomination in Virginia's 33rd Senate district. In 1992, he unsuccessfully ran for Congress against Frank Wolf.

An expert on India–United States relations, he served as United States Assistant Secretary of Commerce for Trade Development under Bill Clinton.

References

External links 
 

1942 births
Living people
Democratic Party members of the Virginia House of Delegates
20th-century American politicians
Duke University alumni
Harvard Law School alumni